Francis Victor Wallington MC & Three Bars (16 October 1891 – 15 February 1971) was a decorated British Army officer. He was the first of four soldiers to be awarded the Military Cross four times, all in the First World War.

Military career
Wallington was born in Woolwich.  He joined the Royal Horse Artillery in 1906. He reached the rank of bombardier while serving with the 7th Brigade, RHA.

Early in the First World War, Wallington served as a soldier in the Royal Artillery, British Army, and reached the rank of serjeant. On 15 August 1914, he departed for France with the British Expeditionary Force. On 30 May 1916, he was commissioned into the Royal Artillery as a second lieutenant "for service in the field". On 2 October 1917, he was promoted to acting captain while he served as second-in-command of a battery of the Royal Field Artillery. On 30 November 1917, he was promoted to lieutenant and retained the acting rank of captain. He retired on 2 May 1923 and was granted the rank of captain.

Wallington married Gwendoline Constance Newton (1892–1936) in Lambeth in 1919.  They lived in Abingdon, and had two sons Francis and Dennis, and a daughter Maureen.  

Wallington later rejoined the British Army. On 7 March 1939, he became a captain and admin officer in the Royal Engineers. With the outbreak of the Second World War, he relinquished his appointment as an admin officer on 2 September 1939. He relinquished his commission in the Territorial Army on 2 September 1939.

Wallington died in Richmond-upon-Thames in 1971.

Honours and decorations
For his service in the First World War, Wallington received the following campaign medals; the 1914 Star with clasp, the British War Medal and the Victory Medal. On 26 January 1917, he was Mentioned in Despatches. He was awarded the Military Cross four times; the first on 26 January 1917, the second on 16 August 1917, the third on 25 August 1917, and the fourth on 16 September 1918.

The citation for his first Military Cross read as follows:

The citation for his second Military Cross read as follows:

The citation for his third Military Cross read as follows:

The citation for his forth and final Military Cross read as follows:

See also
 Three other British soldiers to be awarded the MC and three bars: Percy Bentley, Humphrey Arthur Gilkes, Charles Gordon Timms

References

1891 births
1971 deaths
British Army personnel of World War I
Recipients of the Military Cross
Royal Field Artillery officers
Royal Artillery officers
Royal Engineers officers
Royal Horse Artillery soldiers
British Army personnel of World War II
People from Woolwich
Military personnel from London